William Gilbert Barron (September 12, 1894 – September 23, 1971), known professionally
as Billy Gilbert, was an American actor and comedian. He was known for his comic sneeze routines. He appeared in over 200 feature films, short subjects and television shows beginning in 1929.

Career

Early life and vaudeville career
The child of singers with the Metropolitan Opera, he was born on September 12, 1894, in a dressing room at the Hopkins Opera House in Louisville, Kentucky. As a child, he lived in San Francisco, and he left school to be in a troupe of singing children. His early work included a female-impersonation act and professional boxing. Gilbert began working in vaudeville at the age of 12, and later played in burlesque on the Columbia and Mutual wheels.

Big break in films
Gilbert was spotted by Stan Laurel, who was in the audience of Gilbert's show Sensations of 1929. Laurel went backstage to meet Gilbert and was so impressed by him he introduced him to comedy producer Hal Roach. Gilbert was employed as a gag writer, actor and director, and at the age of 35 he appeared in his first film for the Fox Film Corporation in 1929.

Gilbert broke into comedy short subjects with the Vitaphone studio in 1930 – he appears without billing in the Joe Frisco comedy The Happy Hottentots (restored and released on DVD). Gilbert's burly frame and gruff voice made him a good comic villain, and within the year he was working consistently for producer Roach. He appeared in support of Roach's comedy stars Laurel and Hardy, Charley Chase, Thelma Todd, and Our Gang. One of his Laurel and Hardy appearances was the Academy Award-winning featurette The Music Box (1932). Gilbert generally played blustery tough guys in the Roach comedies, but could play other comic characters, from fey couturiers to pompous radio announcers to roaring drunks. Gilbert's skill at dialects prompted Roach to give him his own series: big Billy Gilbert teamed with little Billy Bletcher as the Dutch-comic "Schmaltz Brothers." in offbeat musical shorts like "Rhapsody in Brew" (which Gilbert also directed). Gilbert regularly starred in Roach's short-comedy series The Taxi Boys, opposite comedians Clyde Cook, Billy Bevan, Franklin Pangborn, and finally Ben Blue.

Like many other Roach contractees, Gilbert found similar work at other studios. He appears in the early comedies of the Three Stooges at Columbia Pictures, as well as in RKO short subjects. These led to featured roles in full-length films, and from 1934 Gilbert became one of the screen's most familiar faces. In 1944, Billy signed with the prestigious William Morris Agency, which led to starring roles and prominent supporting roles in numerous films.

Feature films
One of his standard routines had Gilbert progressively getting excited or nervous about something, and his speech would break down into facial spasms, culminating in a big, loud sneeze. He used this bit so frequently that Walt Disney thought of him immediately when casting the voice of Sneezy in Snow White and the Seven Dwarfs (1937). Gilbert and Disney would later work together again in the "Mickey and the Beanstalk" sequence in Fun and Fancy Free (1947), with Gilbert voicing Willie the Giant in a very similar way to Sneezy. Gilbert did the sneeze routine in a memorable cameo in the Paramount comedy Million Dollar Legs (1932) starring W. C. Fields, Jack Oakie, Susan Fleming, and Ben Turpin.

Gilbert is prominent in most of the movies he appeared in, and he often used dialects. He appeared as "Herring" – a parody of Nazi official Hermann Göring – the minister of war in Charlie Chaplin's The Great Dictator. He danced with Alice Faye and Betty Grable in Tin Pan Alley; he stole scenes as a dim-witted process server in the fast-paced comedy His Girl Friday; playing an Italian character, he played opposite singer Gloria Jean in The Under-Pup and A Little Bit of Heaven. He was also the soda server to Freddie Bartholomew in Captains Courageous. He was featured in the John Wayne and Marlene Dietrich film Seven Sinners. All of these were choice Gilbert roles, and all filmed within a single year, demonstrating how prolific and talented he was.

Gilbert seldom starred in movies but did have occasional opportunities to play leads. In 1943, he headlined a brief series of two-reel comedies for Columbia Pictures. That same year, Monogram Pictures teamed him with the urbane stage comedian Frank Fay for a comedy series; Fay left the series after the first entry. Gilbert asked his closest friend, vaudeville veteran Shemp Howard, to replace him. Howard had been the original third member of the Three Stooges before leaving to pursue a solo career.

Later years

During the late 1940s and early 1950s, Gilbert worked on Broadway in several productions as an actor, writer and director. These include acting roles in Fanny, The Chocolate Soldier, and Gypsy Lady, and directing roles in The Red Mill and other plays. In the 1950s, Billy Gilbert worked frequently in television, including a memorable pantomime sketch with Buster Keaton on You Asked for It. He appeared regularly on the children's program Andy's Gang with Andy Devine, and starred as the giant in the Producers' Showcase TV episode of Jack and the Beanstalk (1956), along with Celeste Holm and Joel Grey as Jack. He retired from the screen following his appearance in the feature Five Weeks in a Balloon (1962).

Personal life
Gilbert married actress Lolly McKenzie. She had appeared as an ingenue in short-subject comedies. Fellow film comedian Charley Chase was the best man. In 1941, Billy and Ella adopted an 11-year-old son, Barry, who died in a 1943 shooting accident.

Ella Baxter McKenzie was an Ulster-Scot whose grandfather John McKenzie was a prominent member of the Orange Order in Ballymena, County Antrim, Northern Ireland. Her father was Robert Baxter McKenzie, who always wore an orange flower on the Twelfth of July, Orangeman's Day in Northern Ireland, in remembrance of the family background and cultural heritage. Ella's sister was film actress Fay McKenzie. The family moved to America and settled in Oregon when he was nine years old. In late 1943, Gilbert appeared with Ella in a USO show, entertaining the US Marines stationed in Derry, Northern Ireland. Ella and Billy visited Ballymena in 1943; an account of their visit is reported in the Larne Times of December 9, 1943.

Death
Gilbert died on September 23, 1971, in North Hollywood at the age of 77, after suffering a stroke. He is buried in the Odd Fellows Cemetery.

Legacy
For his contributions to the motion picture industry, Gilbert has a star on the Hollywood Walk of Fame at 6263 Hollywood Boulevard.

Selected filmography

 The Woman from Hell (1929) as Minor Role (uncredited)
 Noisy Neighbors (1929) as Third Son 
 The Happy Hottentots (1930, short) as Stage Manager
 Sea Legs (1930) as Naval Officer (uncredited)
 First Aid (1931) as Jenkins
 Chinatown After Dark (1931) as Dooley
 Shiver My Timbers (1931 short) as Sea Captain
 The Music Box (1932 short) as Professor Theodore von Schwarzenhoffen (uncredited)
 The Chimp (1932 short) as The Landlord (uncredited)
 Million Dollar Legs (1932) as Secretary of the Interior (uncredited)
 Skyscraper Souls (1932) as Second Ticket Agent (uncredited)
 Blondie of the Follies (1932) as Kinskey's Friend (uncredited)
 Pack Up Your Troubles (1932) as Mr. Hathaway
 County Hospital (1932 short) as The Doctor
 The Taxi Boys - What Price Taxi (1932 short) as Cabbie
 The Taxi Boys - Strange Innertube (1932 short) as Cabbie
 The Taxi Boys - Hot Spot (1932 short) as Cabbie
 The Taxi Boys - Taxi for Two (1932 short) as Cabbie
 The Taxi Boys - Bring 'Em Back a Wife (1933 short) as Billy Gilbert
 The Taxi Boys - Wreckety Wrecks (1933 short) as Billy
 The Taxi Boys - Taxi Barons (1933 short) as Billy
 The Taxi Boys - Call Her Sausage (1933 short) as Heinie Schmaltz
 The Taxi Boys - The Rummy (1933 short) as Schmaltz
 Made on Broadway (1933) as Commissioner Jerry Allesandro (uncredited)
 The Girl in 419 (1933) as Sneezing Patient (uncredited)
 So and Sew (1933 short) as Rudolpho
 This Day and Age (1933) as Manager of Nightclub (uncredited)
 Sons of the Desert (1933) as Mr. Rutledge (voice, uncredited)
 Cockeyed Cavaliers (1934) as Innkeeper (uncredited)
 Peck's Bad Boy (1934) (uncredited)
 Happy Landing (1934) as Husband (uncredited)
 Men in Black (1934, Three Stooges short) as Dangerous Patient (uncredited)
 Evelyn Prentice (1935) as First Chef (uncredited)
 Escapade (1935) as Singer (uncredited)
 Mad Love (1935) as Autograph Seeker on Train (uncredited)
 Pardon My Scotch (1935, Three Stooges short) as opera singer Signor Louis Bellero Cantino (uncredited)
 Curly Top (1935) as The Cook (uncredited)
 Here Comes the Band (1935) as Oswald Carroll (uncredited)
 Hi, Gaucho! (1935) as Cappa Rosa - Del Campo's Foreman (uncredited)
 A Night at the Opera (1935) as Orchestra Member asking Fiorello not to play the piano (uncredited)
 Coronado (1935) as Waiter (uncredited)
 I Dream Too Much (1935) as Cook at Cafe (uncredited)
 Millions in the Air (1935) as Nikolas Popadopolis
 Dangerous Waters (1936) as Carlos (uncredited)
 Sutter's Gold (1936) as Gen. Ramos (uncredited)
 Love on a Bet (1936) as New York Policeman (uncredited)
 The First Baby (1936) as Italian in Park (uncredited)
 One Rainy Afternoon (1936) as Courtroom Doorman (uncredited)
 Three of a Kind (1936) as The Tailor
 Early to Bed (1936) as Burger
 Parole! (1936) as Salvatore Arriolo (uncredited)
 Poor Little Rich Girl (1936) as Waiter (uncredited)
 Kelly the Second (1936) as Fur trader (role deleted) (uncredited)
 The Bride Walks Out (1936) as Mr. Donovan
 The Devil-Doll (1936) as Matin's Butler (uncredited)
 Grand Jury (1936) as Otto, Janitor (uncredited)
 My American Wife (1936) as French Chef (uncredited)
 Pepper (1936) as Man Eating Sandwich (uncredited)
 Bulldog Edition (1936) as George Poppupoppalas (uncredited)
 The Big Game (1936) as Fisher (uncredited)
 Love on the Run (1936) as Maitre d' (uncredited)
 Night Waitress (1936) as Torre - Cafe Owner
 On the Avenue (1937) as Joe Papaloupas
 We're on the Jury (1937) as Mr. Ephraim Allen
 When You're in Love (1937) as Jose the Bartender (uncredited)
 Sea Devils (1937) as Billy (policeman)
 Espionage (1937) as Turk
 China Passage (1937) as Ship's Bartender
 Maytime (1937) as Drunk (uncredited)
 The Man Who Found Himself (1937) as Fat Hobo
 The Outcasts of Poker Flat (1937) as Charley - the Bartender
 Captains Courageous (1937) as Soda Steward (uncredited)
 The Toast of New York (1937) as Photographer
 Broadway Melody of 1938 (1937) as George Papaloopas
 The Firefly (1937) as Inn Keeper
 The Life of the Party (1937) as Dr. Molnac
 One Hundred Men and a Girl (1937) as Garage Owner
 Music for Madame (1937) as Krause
 Fight for Your Lady (1937) as Boris
 Snow White and the Seven Dwarfs (1937) as Sneezy (voice, uncredited)
 Rosalie (1937) as Oloff
 She's Got Everything (1937) as Chaffee - a Creditor
 Once Over Lightly (1938 short) as Professor Dimitrius Kapouris
 Happy Landing (1938) as Counter Man
 Maid's Night Out (1938) as Mr. Papalapoulas
 Joy of Living (1938) as Cafe Owner
 Army Girl (1938) as Cantina Pete
 Block-Heads (1938) as Mr. Gilbert
 My Lucky Star (1938) as Nick
 Breaking the Ice (1938) as Mr. Small
 Mr. Doodle Kicks Off (1938) as Professor Minorous
 Peck's Bad Boy with the Circus (1938) as Bud Boggs
 The Girl Downstairs (1938) as Garage Proprietor
 Forged Passport (1939) as Nick Mendoza
 Million Dollar Legs (1939) as Dick Schultz (uncredited)
 The Under-Pup (1939) as Tolio
 The Star Maker (1939) as Steel Worker
 Rio (1939) as Manuelo
 Destry Rides Again (1939) as Loupgerou
 His Girl Friday (1940) as Joe Pettibone
 Sandy Is a Lady (1940) as Billy Pepino
 Women in War (1940) as Pierre, the Cobbler
 Safari (1940) as Mondehare
 Queen of the Mob (1940) as Mr. Reier
 Cross-Country Romance (1940) as Orestes
 Scatterbrain (1940) as Hoffman
 Lucky Partners (1940) as Charles (uncredited)
 Sing, Dance, Plenty Hot (1940) as Hector
 A Little Bit of Heaven (1940) as Tony
 The Villain Still Pursued Her (1940) as Master of Ceremonies
 The Great Dictator (1940) as Herring
 Seven Sinners (1940) as Tony
 Tin Pan Alley (1940) as Sheik
 A Night at Earl Carroll's (1940) as Machinist's Mate
 No, No, Nanette (1940) as Styles
 The Great Awakening (1941) as Dominic
 Reaching for the Sun (1941) as Amos
 One Night in Lisbon (1941) as Popopopoulos
 Angels with Broken Wings (1941) as Billy Wilson
 New Wine (1941) as Poldi
 Week-End in Havana (1941) as Arbolado
 Song of the Islands (1942) as Palola's Father
 Valley of the Sun (1942) as Judge Homer Burnaby
 Mr. Wise Guy (1942) as Knobby
 Sleepytime Gal (1942) as Chef Popodopolis
 Arabian Nights (1942) as Ahmad
 Shantytown (1943) as 'Papa' Ferrelli
 Spotlight Scandals (1943) as Himself
 Always a Bridesmaid (1943) as Nicholas 'Nick' Neopolitan
 Crazy House (1943) as Sid Drake
 Three of a Kind (1944) as Billy
 Ever Since Venus (1944) as Tiny Lewis
 Three Is a Family (1944) (uncredited)
 Crazy Knights (1944) as Billy
 Trouble Chasers (1945) as Billy
 Anchors Aweigh (1945) as Cafe Manager
 Fun and Fancy Free (1947) as Willie the Giant (voice)
 The Kissing Bandit (1948) as General Felipe Toro
 Bride of Vengeance (1949) as Beppo (uncredited)
 Down Among the Sheltering Palms (1953) as King Jilouili
 Paradise Alley (1962) as Julius Wilson
 Five Weeks in a Balloon (1962) as Sultan / Auctioneer (final film role)

See also

References

Further reading

External links

Literature on Billy Gilbert

1894 births
1971 deaths
American male comedians
American comedy writers
American film directors
American male voice actors
Hal Roach Studios actors
Male actors from Louisville, Kentucky
Vaudeville performers
20th-century American male actors
Hal Roach Studios short film series
Comedians from Kentucky
Comedians from California
20th-century American comedians